Torf, Seigneur de Torville, was a Norman baron. His parentage is unknown. 

Born in the early 10th century, he possessed numerous lordships in Normandy, including Seigneur de Torville, Torcy, Torny, Torly, and de Ponteautorf. 

Torf's children included: 

 Turold de Pont-Audemer, Sire de Ponteaudemer, married Duvelina
 Turchetil, Seigneur de Turqueville
 William de Torville

References

Sources

Barons of France
10th-century Normans